Marie Annharte Baker (born 1942) is an Anishnabe poet and author, a cultural critic and activist, and a performance artist/contemporary storyteller. Former surnames are Baker and Funmaker.

Through books, poetry, essays, interviews and performance Annharte articulates and critiques life from western Canada, with a special focus on women, urban, indigenous, disabilities, academic, and poverty-centric (or "street") awareness and issues/foibles.

Life
Baker is from Little Saskatchewan First Nation and she was born in 1942 and grew up in Winnipeg. Her father was Irish and her mother was Anishinabe. Marie Annharte Baker was considered to be part of a specific Anishinabe nation, the Obibwa. She would spend her holidays with her Anishinabe grandparents on a reservation in Manitoba. She received what she considered an unsuccessful education at Brandon College, the University of British Columbia and the Simon Fraser University during the 1960s. Baker considers herself self-taught but she did return to education in the 1970s and this included a degree in English for the University of Winnipeg. After graduating, Baker became involved in Native American activism, and taught Native Studies at multiple colleges in Minneapolis.  Baker was one of the first people in North America to teach a class entirely on Native American women. After her teaching career, Baker returned to Winnipeg and began to work as a community family advocate. 

She has been associated with (studied or taught at) the University of Manitoba, University of Winnipeg, Brandon University, and University of Minnesota. She has collaborated with or co-founded numerous groups of community-based writer activists, including Regina Aboriginal Writers Group and the Aboriginal Writers Collective of Manitoba. She was a founding member of the Canadian Indian Youth Council.  Presently, she is organizing Nokomis Storyteller Theatre which features comic/clown and puppet performances.

Books
 Being on the Moon, Vancouver: Polestar, 1990; Vancouver: Raincoast Books, 2000
 Coyote Columbus Cafe, Winnipeg: Moonprint, 1994
 Exercises in Lip Pointing, Vancouver: New Star Books, 2003
 Indigena Awry, Vancouver: New Star Books, 2013

See also

Canadian literature
Canadian poetry
List of Canadian poets
List of Canadian writers
List of writers from peoples indigenous to the Americas

References

External links
 http://www.ipl.org/div/natam/bin/browse.pl/A161

1942 births
Living people
Canadian women essayists
Canadian women poets
First Nations poets
First Nations women writers
Ojibwe people
People from Interlake Region, Manitoba
Writers from Manitoba
20th-century Canadian essayists
21st-century Canadian essayists
20th-century Canadian poets
21st-century Canadian poets
20th-century Canadian women writers
21st-century Canadian women writers
20th-century First Nations writers
21st-century First Nations writers